Setas de Sevilla ("Mushrooms of Seville") or Las Setas ("The Mushrooms"), initially titled Metropol Parasol, is a wooden structure located at La Encarnación square in the old quarter of Seville, Spain. It was designed by the German architect Jürgen Mayer and completed in April 2011. Its appearance, location, delays and cost overruns in construction resulted in much public controversy.

Description

The structure consists of six parasols in the form of giant mushrooms, whose design is inspired by the vaults of the Cathedral of Seville and the ficus trees in the nearby Plaza de Cristo de Burgos.  The Setas are organized in four levels. The underground level (Level 0) houses the Antiquarium, where Roman and Moorish remains discovered on site are displayed in a museum. Level 1 (street level) is the Central Market.  The roof of Level 1 is the surface of the open-air public plaza, shaded by the wooden parasols above and designed for public events.  Levels 2 and 3 are the two stages of the panoramic terraces (including a restaurant), offering a view of the city centre.

History

From the 19th century a market was located in the plaza, housed in a dedicated building. The building was partially demolished in 1948 in accordance with plans for urban renewal. The market itself remained, however, until 1973, when the rest of the dilapidated building was finally demolished. The land remained dormant until 1990, when the city decided to construct underground parking with space for a market on top. However, in the midst of construction, ruins dating to the Roman and Al-Andalus eras were discovered, and construction was frozen after an expenditure of 14 million euros. In 2004, the city decided to attempt to develop the area again, and opened an international competition to solicit bids.

Construction

Construction began on June 26, 2005, with an estimated cost of 50 million euros and a projected completion date in June 2007.  However, unknown to the public, the project soon faced difficulties.  By May 2007 engineering firm Arup informed the municipal authorities that the structure was technically unfeasible as designed, given that a number of structural assumptions had not been tested and the design appeared to violate the limitations of known materials. The wood used was birch, imported from Finland, because of its straight qualities.  Much time was spent developing feasible alternative plans to buttress the structure, which themselves proved impractical because of the added weight.  A feasible design using glue as reinforcement was finally settled on only at the beginning of 2009. By some estimates, due to delays, the total cost of the structure approached 100 million euros.

Notes

References

Buildings and structures in Seville
Tourist attractions in Seville
Wooden buildings and structures in Spain